is a Japanese cyclist, who currently rides for UCI Continental team .

Major results
2008
 1st  Road race, National Under-23 Road Championships
2017
 3rd Overall Tour de Selangor
 8th Tour de Okinawa
 10th Overall Tour of Thailand
2021
 10th Oita Urban Classic
2022
 7th Tour de Okinawa

References

External links

1988 births
Living people
Japanese male cyclists
People from Fukuyama, Hiroshima